Samir Gharbo (13 March 1925 – 10 April 2018) was an Egyptian water polo player who competed in the 1948 Summer Olympics and in the 1952 Summer Olympics.

References

1925 births
2018 deaths
Egyptian male water polo players
Olympic water polo players of Egypt
Water polo players at the 1948 Summer Olympics
Water polo players at the 1952 Summer Olympics
20th-century Egyptian people